Chun Kwan Temple is a temple dedicated to Chun Kwan on Tsing Yi Island in Hong Kong. Chun Kwan was a commoner who had combatted pirates during the South Song Dynasty (9601279).

The original temple was built on the waterfront 100 years ago and later moved to its present location on the junction of Tsing Yi Heung Sze Wui Road and Fung Shue Wo Road.

During Chun Kwan's Birthday, on the 15th day of the third lunar month, traditional Cantonese opera performances are staged for 5 days.

See also
 Chun Kwan
 Tsing Yi Bamboo Theatre
 Tin Hau temples in Hong Kong
 Hip Tin temples in Hong Kong
 Kwan Tai temples in Hong Kong
 Places of worship in Hong Kong

References

External links

 Openlife entry (archive)

Tsing Yi
Taoist temples in Hong Kong